Stavely is a town in southern Alberta, Canada.

History

Stavely was named for Alexander Staveley Hill, Managing Director of the Oxley Ranching Company that was founded in 1882 by John R Craig on 100,000 acres of grazing rights.

The Canadian Pacific Railway once ran through the town. Its closure led to the removal of all but one of Stavely's grain elevators.

The people of Stavely and area are proud of their friendliness and community spirit.

Demographics 

In the 2016 Census of Population conducted by Statistics Canada, the Town of Stavely recorded a population of 541 living in 265 of its 290 total private dwellings, a  change from its 2011 population of 505.

Arts and culture 
Stavely is known as the home of the Stavely Indoor Rodeo. Founded in 1929, it is the world's first indoor rodeo.
In 1996 the miniseries In Cold Blood was filmed in Stavely.
In 2012 the community celebrated its 100th birthday.

Attractions 
The town has a 9-hole golf course named the Stavely Golf Club. It was one of the few remaining sand green golf courses in Canada until the sand greens were recently converted to artificial greens. Other recreation venues and facilities include an arena, archery lanes, a recreational vehicle campground, a ball diamond and parks. Stavely is also home to a museum.

Clear Lake recreation area (camping/water sports) is located 19 km east of Stavely.  Willow Creek Municipal Park (campground) is located
16 km west of Stavely.

Education 
Stavely's only school, Stavely Elementary School, teaches local children from Kindergarten through Grade 6.  The school was renovated in 2002, and its school motto is Every Child Shines.
Prior to the 2002 renovation, grades 7-9 students attended A. J. Nowicki Jr. High School, which has been demolished.  The Stavely Education Foundation has been established to assist former students with the costs of post-secondary education.

Community services 
The following is a list of the Town of Stavely's volunteer community organizations and service groups.

 
B.P.O.Elks Lodge #112
O.O.R.P. Lodge #99
Beaver I.O.O.F. Lodge #27
Masonic Lodge
Museum Society of Stavely & District
Silverleaf Rebekah Lodge #99
Stavely & District Agricultural Society
Stavely & District Youth Society
Stavely Archery Lane
Glen Keeley Memorial Bull Riding Committee
Stavely Community Chest
Stavely Community Hall Board
 
Stavely Figure Skating Club
Stavely Golden Age Centre
Stavely Golf Club
Stavely Indoor Pro Rodeo Committee 
Stavely Local Initiatives
Stavely Minor Hockey
Stavely Municipal Library
Stavely Pheasant Derby
Stavely Stampeders 4-H Light Horse Club
Stavely/Parkland 4-H Beef Club
United Church Women
Willow Creek Cowboy Poetry & Music Society
Stavely Fire Department

See also 
List of communities in Alberta
List of towns in Alberta

References

External links 

1903 establishments in the Northwest Territories
Populated places established in 1903
Towns in Alberta